Jeff Gelb is an American writer and editor. He won the 2005 Bram Stoker Award for Best Anthology with Del Howison for the book Dark Delicacies: Original Tales of Terror and the Macabre.

Awards and nominations
In 2005, Gelb and co-editor Del Howison published Dark Delicacies: Original Tales of Terror and the Macabre (Carroll and Graf), which included stories by Ray Bradbury, Clive Barker, F. Paul Wilson, Chelsea Quinn Yarbro, David J. Schow, Steve Niles, Roberta Lannes, Gahan Wilson, and more. The book went on to win the 2005 Bram Stoker Award for Best Anthology.

In 2007, Gelb and co-editor Del Howison published Dark Delicacies II: Fear (Carroll and Graf). This book was nominated for a Bram Stoker Award and a Shirley Jackson Award for Best Anthology.

See also
List of horror fiction authors

References

External links
https://www.goodreads.com/author/show/79743.Jeff_Gelb
http://www.isfdb.org/cgi-bin/ea.cgi?5875
https://www.sdcomicfest.org/jeff-gelb/

American horror writers
American fantasy writers
20th-century American male writers
21st-century American male writers
Year of birth missing (living people)
Living people